Larry James Pinkney is an American political activist. A former member of the Black Panther Party, and the Republic of New Africa, he served nine years in prison in Canada and the U.S. Pinkney also served as co-chair of the San Francisco Black Caucus in the early 1970s, and later, as chairman of the Black National Independence Party.

Pinkney was convicted of assault and burglary charges in the United States in 1973, accusations which he denied. Before sentencing, he fled to Europe and then to Canada, intending to apply for political asylum. In Vancouver, he was convicted in 1976 of attempted extortion and sentenced to a five-year prison term. While in prison, he filed a case with the United Nations Human Rights Committee in Geneva, which ruled that the Canadian government had violated Pinkney's rights through lengthy delays in providing court documents needed to file an appeal. Pinkney served his full five-year sentence in a Canadian prison.
 Pinkney has criticized the Democratic Party and praised President Donald Trump for his stance on free speech and policies  that Pinkney believes are helping the African American community. He had been a frequent guest on The Alex Jones Show.

External links
University of Minnesota Human Rights Library: Larry James Pinkney v. Canada, Communication No. 27/1978, U.N. Doc. CCPR/C/OP/1 at 12 (1984)
Black Activist Writers Guild: Larry Pinkney Archives

References

Pinkney, Larry
Pinkney, Larry